Robert Smigel (born February 7, 1960) is an American actor, comedian, writer, director, producer, and puppeteer, known for his Saturday Night Live "TV Funhouse" cartoon shorts and as the puppeteer and voice behind Triumph the Insult Comic Dog. He also co-wrote the first two Hotel Transylvania films and You Don't Mess with the Zohan, all starring Adam Sandler.

Early life
Smigel was born in New York City, to Lucia and Irwin Smigel, an aesthetic dentist, innovator and philanthropist. He is Jewish and frequently went to Jewish summer camp. He attended Cornell University, studying pre-dental, and graduated from New York University in 1983 with a degree in political science.

Smigel began developing his comedic talent at The Players Workshop in Chicago, where he studied improvisation with Josephine Forsberg. Bob Odenkirk was a fellow student there. Smigel was also a member of the Chicago comedy troupe "All You Can Eat" in the early 1980s.

Career
Smigel first established himself as a writer on Saturday Night Live by joining the writing staff when Lorne Michaels returned as executive producer for the 1985–1986 season. Smigel was hired after then-SNL producers Al Franken and Tom Davis saw Smigel in a Chicago sketch show. After the 1985–1986 season proved to be a disappointment with critics, in the ratings, and with Brandon Tartikoff (who was planning to have SNL canceled by the last episode of season 11 due to its sliding ratings), Michaels fired most of the cast and writers, retained the cast and writers who were standouts during the otherwise dismal season (Smigel being one of them), and hired new ones for the 1986–1987 season. This is when Smigel began to write more memorable sketches, including one where host William Shatner urged worshipful attendees at a Star Trek convention to "get a life." Smigel rarely appeared on screen, though he was credited as a featured player in the early 1990s and played a recurring character in the Bill Swerski's Superfans sketches.

While on a writers' strike from Saturday Night Live following the 1987–88 season, Smigel wrote for an improvisational comedy revue in Chicago with fellow SNL writers Bob Odenkirk and Conan O'Brien called Happy Happy Good Show.

Smigel co-wrote Lookwell with Conan O'Brien for NBC. The pilot never went to series, but it has become a cult hit and has screened live at "The Other Network", a festival of un-aired TV pilots produced by Un-Cabaret, featuring live and taped intros by Smigel. Smigel later became the first head writer at Late Night with Conan O'Brien, where he created numerous successful comedy bits, including one where Smigel performed only the lips of public figures which were superimposed on photos of the actual people. (This technique was pioneered on the Clutch Cargo cartoon series as a cost-saving measure, and was known as Syncro-Vox.)

In 1996, Smigel wrote and performed on the short-lived Dana Carvey Show, a primetime sketch comedy program on ABC. Despite its premature end, the show provided Smigel the opportunity to debut his first cartoon The Ambiguously Gay Duo. Upon the show's cancellation, Smigel continued developing more cartoon ideas the following summer and would begin airing them on Saturday Night Live under the TV Funhouse banner. Smigel would later claim "My whole career came out of the impulse to do cartoons on The Dana Carvey Show."

Smigel's most famous creation, however, would be the foul-mouthed puppet Triumph the Insult Comic Dog, who mercilessly mocks celebrities and others in the style of a Borscht Belt comedian. This character debuted on Late Night with Conan O'Brien in February 1997 and would continue to make appearances on the show, as well as others, for many years to come.

Smigel continued to establish himself on Saturday Night Live by producing short animated segments under the title TV Funhouse, which usually satirizes public figures and popular culture. It spawned a TV show on Comedy Central featuring a mix of puppets, animation, and short sketches, although only eight episodes were aired (during the winter of 2000–2001). Smigel occasionally appears in films (usually alongside SNL veterans such as Adam Sandler). According to interviews, Smigel helped punch up the scripts for Little Nicky and The Wedding Singer. Smigel acted alongside fellow SNL writer Bob Odenkirk in Wayne's World 2 as a nerd backstage at an Aerosmith concert. His contributions were uncredited.

In 2000, he voiced a sage bulldog named Mr. Beefy in Little Nicky. Smigel, along with Adam Sandler and Judd Apatow, wrote the script for the film You Don't Mess with the Zohan in which Smigel played Yosi, an Israeli electronics salesman. Smigel is also one of the executive producers of the film, which is a first for him despite his frequent collaborations with Sandler.

It was reported in 2006 that Smigel and Adam Sandler were working on an animated sitcom for Fox called Animals. Fox has not made any official statement regarding the show. Additionally, Smigel played a gay mailman in the Adam Sandler film I Now Pronounce You Chuck and Larry and Yari the Mechanic in the "Mister Softee" episode of Curb Your Enthusiasm.

He voiced Ray and a parody of the Star Wars character, Emperor Palpatine, in the first episode of Robot Chicken: Star Wars, as well as the monster 100 in the episode of the same name of Aqua Teen Hunger Force.

Currently living in New York, he co-wrote and co-executive produced the films Hotel Transylvania (2012) and Hotel Transylvania 2 (2015), in which he voiced Marty, a fake version of Dracula, and Harry Three-Eye, respectively. In the fifth season of the FX show, Louie, Smigel received a story credit on the episode "Cop Story", as a similar incident as to what appears in the show actually happened to him, down to the cop crying in his apartment while Smigel went out, found the missing gun and carried it home, terrified that anyone would notice. Michael Rapaport's character wasn't based on the man Smigel knew, however, since all Smigel ever told Louis C.K. about was the gun itself.

Smigel created, wrote, executive produced, and starred as Triumph the Insult Comic Dog in The Jack and Triumph Show, alongside Jack McBrayer in 2015. It was announced in January 2016 that Smigel would be starring as Triumph in Triumph's Election Special 2016 on Hulu the following February.

In September 2020, after being brought on to develop the project in 2019, Fox announced that Smigel would executive produce Let's Be Real — a one-off adaptation of the French satirical series Les Guignols.

On June 16, 2022, Smigel was arrested for unlawful entry of the Longworth House Office Building in Washington, D.C, along with eight other individuals associated with The Late Show with Stephen Colbert. CBS released a statement saying that “Their interviews at the Capitol were authorized and pre-arranged through Congressional aides of the members interviewed," and that "After leaving the members’ offices on their last interview of the day, the production team stayed to film stand-ups and other final comedy elements in the halls when they were detained by Capitol Police.” Fox News pundit Tucker Carlson accused Smigel of "insurrection" and that it was "exactly like what happened" in apparent reference to the 2021 United States Capitol attack. Stephen Colbert addressed the incident in his monologue, stating that Smigel had committed "First-Degree Puppetry" and that "Drawing any equivalence between rioters storming our Capitol to prevent the counting of electoral ballots and a cigar-chomping toy dog is a shameful and grotesque insult to the memory of everyone who died.” The United States Capitol Police released a statement saying that “This is an active criminal investigation, and may result in additional criminal charges after consultation with the U.S. Attorney.”

Personal life
Smigel has a wife, Michelle, and three children. Michelle and Robert serve on the board of NEXT for AUTISM, formerly New York Collaborates for Autism, a non-profit organization founded in 2003 to address the needs of autistic individuals and their families, as their eldest child has autism. Smigel created the Night of Too Many Stars, a biannual celebrity fundraiser to benefit autism education. He won a writing Emmy for the 2012 broadcast of Night of Too Many Stars.

Recurring characters on SNL
Carl Wollarski, from "Bill Swerski's Superfans"
Hank Fielding, with "The Moron's Perspective" on Weekend Update
One of the Hub's Gyros employees (aka the "You like-ah the Juice?" guys)
Avi, the "Sabra Price is Right" announcer
Bighead, in "The Ambiguously Gay Duo" cartoons

Celebrity impressions

Alan Dershowitz (on SNL)
Woody Allen (on SNL)
Al Sharpton (on SNL TV Funhouse cartoon)
Al Franken (on SNL TV Funhouse cartoon)
William Ginsberg (on SNL TV Funhouse cartoon)
Don McLean (on SNL TV Funhouse cartoon)
Lorne Michaels (on SNL TV Funhouse cartoon)
Pat Robertson (on SNL TV Funhouse cartoon)
Michael Gross (on SNL TV Funhouse cartoon)
Thomas Mesereau (on SNL TV Funhouse cartoon)
Sinbad (on SNL TV Funhouse cartoon)
Bob Dole (on The Dana Carvey Show)
Gene Shalit (on The Dana Carvey Show)
Joel Siegel (on The Dana Carvey Show)
Bob Ross (on The Dana Carvey Show)
Rip Torn (on The Dana Carvey Show)
Bill Walton (on The Dana Carvey Show)
Richard Nixon (on The Dana Carvey Show)
Sam Donaldson (on The Dana Carvey Show)
Hussein of Jordan (on The Dana Carvey Show)
Quentin Tarantino (on The Dana Carvey Show)
Ringo Starr (on The Dana Carvey Show)

Recurring characters on Late Night with Conan O'Brien
Triumph the Insult Comic Dog
"Clutch Cargo" celebrity interviews (Bill Clinton, George W. Bush, Arnold Schwarzenegger, Don King, Bob Dole, etc.)
One of the "Nicknames for Conan" guys (aka the "Conan the Barbarian" guys)
One of the "Ameri-clan" guys (with Doug Dale, Louis C.K. and Dino Stamatopoulos)
Voice of "The Late Night Emergency Guest" mannequin
Gibberish Speaking Ronald Reagan on the Phone
Ira, Conan's publicist

Filmography

Film

Television

Music video

Further reading
DiGiacomo, Frank. "Triumph Sniffs a Hit". The New York Observer (October 20, 2003).

References

External links
 
 Interview with The A.V. Club

1960 births
Living people
American male comedians
American male film actors
American male screenwriters
American male television actors
American male television writers
American puppeteers
American sketch comedians
American television writers
Autism activists
Comedians from Illinois
Cornell University alumni
Jewish American comedians
Jewish American male actors
Jewish American writers
Male actors from Chicago
Male actors from New York City
Primetime Emmy Award winners
Screenwriters from Illinois
Screenwriters from New York (state)
Steinhardt School of Culture, Education, and Human Development alumni
Writers Guild of America Award winners
20th-century American comedians
21st-century American comedians
20th-century American male actors
21st-century American male actors
21st-century American Jews